Yablonovo is a rural locality (a selo) and the administrative center of Yablonovskoye Rural Settlement, Korochansky District, Belgorod Oblast, Russia. The population was 1,711 as of 2010. There are 20 streets.

Geography 
Yablonovo is located 14 km northeast of Korocha (the district's administrative centre) by road. Spornoye is the nearest rural locality.

References 

Rural localities in Korochansky District
Korochansky Uyezd